The Camiguin boobook or Camiguin hawk-owl (Ninox leventisi) is an owl species resident to the Camiguin island in the Philippines. It is the only owl in the country with greenish-yellow or grayish eyes.  It was previously known as a subspecies of the Philippine hawk-owl, but was reclassified in 2012, as voice and other evidence suggested it a distinct species. Its native name is kugkug

Description 
EBird describes the bird as "A rare medium-sized owl of remnant broadleaf forest on Camiguin Island. Uniformly barred, with a brown head and upperparts, a pale bar behind the shoulder, warmer brown underparts, long whiskers around the face, and pale yellow eyes. Note the white throat patch. Song is a rapid series of fairly low 'woop' notes, sometimes given in duet. White throat particularly noticeable when calling."

Among the species complex, this owl is unique in that its eyes are striking greenish-yellow versus the standard yellow or reddish-brown eyes of the rest of its related species. 

Along with the Romblon boobook and Cebu boobook, it is the largest in the Philippine hawk-owl species complex reaching sizes of 25cm tall versus the much smaller Luzon boobook, Mindanao boobook, Mindoro boobook and Sulu boobook, which range in size from 15 to 20cm tall.

Habitat and conservation status 
Its habitat is in tropical moist lowland  primary and secondary forests up to 700 meters above sea level. It is also occasionally seen on forest edge, clearings and plantations.

The IUCN Red List classifies this bird as vulnerable with population estimates of 250 to 999 mature individuals. This species' main threat is habitat loss with wholesale clearance of forest habitats as a result of legal and illegal logging, mining and conversion into farmlands through Slash-and-burn and urbanization mostly due to an influx of tourists which have forced these birds to the uplands.

There are no species specific conservation programs going on at the moment but conservation actions proposed include more species surveys to better understand habitat and population. initiate education and awareness campaigns to raise the species's profile and instill pride in locals. Lobby for protection of remaining forest.

References

Camiguin boobook
Endemic birds of the Philippines
Fauna of Camiguin
Camiguin boobook
Camiguin boobook
Camiguin boobook
Camiguin boobook
Camiguin boobook
Camiguin boobook
Camiguin boobook
Camiguin boobook